Bill Herron is a former Australian rules footballer who played for West Perth in the Western Australian Football League (WAFL), and Glenelg in the South Australian National Football League (SANFL).

References

External links 

Living people
Glenelg Football Club players
Australian rules footballers from Adelaide
Christies Beach Football Club players
Year of birth missing (living people)